Carbon-fiber tape is a flat material made of carbon fiber. It weighs one-seventh as much as steel for a given strength.
The carbon fiber core lasts longer than conventional steel cable. The material is resistant to wear and abrasion and, unlike steel, does not densify and stretch.

Applications

In June 2013, KONE elevator company announced Ultrarope for use as a replacement for steel cables in elevators. It seals the carbon fibers in high-friction polymer. Unlike steel cable, Ultrarope was designed for buildings that require up to 1,000 meters of lift. Steel elevators top out at 500 meters. The company estimated that in a 500-meter-high building, an elevator would use 15 per cent less electrical power than a steel-cabled version. As of June 2013, the product had passed all European Union and US certification tests.

See also
 Carbon fibers

References

Allotropes of carbon
Elevators